The Niagara Purple Eagles men's ice hockey team is a National Collegiate Athletic Association (NCAA) Division I college ice hockey program that represents Niagara University. The Purple Eagles are a member of Atlantic Hockey. They play at the Dwyer Arena in Lewiston, New York.

History 
After several years of playing at the club level, the team turned varsity in the 1996–97 season, which they played as independent.

In 1999 they became charter members of the College Hockey America, joining two other independent teams (Air Force and Army) and three former Division II teams (Alabama–Huntsville, Bemidji State and Findlay).

Niagara went undefeated in conference play that season, 1999–00, winning the conference tournament and gaining an at-large invitation to the NCAA Tournament, as the conference did not gain an automatic bid until the 2003 tournament. Starting goaltender Greg Gardner set a single-season NCAA record for shutouts with 12 as Niagara posted its first (and only as of 2019) 30-win campaign. The Purple Eagles upset the University of New Hampshire to advance to the Elite Eight, where they lost to North Dakota. North Dakota went on to win that national championship.

Niagara also won the College Hockey America Championship in 2004 and 2008, appearing in the NCAA Men's Ice Hockey Championship again those years. In 2004 they lost against Boston College and in 2008 against Michigan.
 
On January 29, 2009, Niagara University announced that the team was moving to Atlantic Hockey beginning in the 2010-11 season.

On October 14, 2010, it was announced that Jay McKee would serve as a volunteer assistant coach for Niagara Purple Eagles men's ice hockey, while not ruling out a return to the NHL.

On December 14, 2013 the Purple Eagles faced off against the RIT Tigers in an outdoor hockey game known as Frozen Frontier tying 2-2.

Season-by-season results

Source:

Head coaches
As of the completion of 2022–23 season

NCAA Tournament appearances

Statistical leaders
Source:

Career points leaders

Career goaltending leaders

GP = Games played; Min = Minutes played; W = Wins; L = Losses; T = Ties; GA = Goals against; SO = Shutouts; SV% = Save percentage; GAA = Goals against average

minimum 30 games played

Statistics current through the start of the 2021–22 season.

Roster
As of June 30, 2022.

Awards and honors

NCAA

All-Americans
AHCA Second Team All-Americans

2010–11: Paul Zanette, F

CHA

Individual Awards

Player of the Year
Greg Gardner: 1999
Joe Tallari: 2003
Barret Ehgoetz: 2004
Jeff Van Nynatten: 2006
Sean Bentivoglio: 2007
Juliano Pagliero: 2009

Rookie of the Year
Ted Cook: 2006
Les Reaney: 2006
Chris Moran: 2007

Most Valuable Player in Tournament
Kyle Martin: 2000
Jeff Van Nynatten: 2004
Ted Cook: 2008

Coach of the Year
Blaise MacDonald: 2000
Dave Burkholder: 2006, 2007

Three-Star Player of the Year
Ted Cook: 2007

Student-Athlete of the Year
Vince Rocco: 2009

All-Conference Teams
First Team All-CHA

1999–00: Greg Gardner, G; Chris MacKenzie, D; Kyle Martin, F; Mike Isherwood, F
2002–03: Joe Tallari, F
2003–04: Jeff Van Nynatten, G; Barret Ehgoetz, F
2004–05: Barret Ehgoetz, F
2005–06: Sean Bentivoglio, F
2006–07: Pat Oliveto, D; Sean Bentivoglio, F; Ted Cook, F
2007–08: Juliano Pagliero, G; Ryan Annesley, D; Vince Rocco, F
2008–09: Juliano Pagliero, G
2009–10: Chris Moran, F

Second Team All-CHA

1999–00: Mikko Sivonen, F
2000–01: Bernie Sigrist, F
2001–02: Scott Crawford, D
2002–03: Barret Ehgoetz, F
2003–04: Andrew Lackner, D; Joe Tallari, F
2004–05: Ryan Gale, F
2005–06: Jeff Van Nynatten, G; Ted Cook, F; Les Reaney, F
2006–07: Juliano Pagliero, G; Les Reaney, F
2007–08: Tyler Gotto, D; Matt Caruana, F
2008–09: Tyler Gotto, D; Vince Rocco, F; Egor Mironov, F
2009–10: Tyler Gotto, D; Ryan Olidis, F

All-CHA Rookie Team

2002–03: Brian Hartman, D; Jason Williamson, F
2003–04: Pat Oliveto, F
2005–06: Ted Cook, F; Les Reaney, F
2006–07: Tyler Gotto, D; Chris Moran, F
2007–08: Adam Avramenko, G
2008–09: Dan Baco, D
2009–10: Jason Beattie, F

Atlantic Hockey

Individual Awards

Player of the Year
Paul Zanette: 2011
Carsen Chubak: 2013

Rookie of the Year
Ludwig Stenlund: 2019

Regular Season Goaltending Award
Chris Noonan: 2012

Regular Season Scoring Trophy
Paul Zanette: 2011

Coach of the Year
Dave Burkholder: 2013

Most Valuable Player in Tournament
Scott Champagne: 2005

All-Conference Teams
First Team All-Atlantic Hockey

2010–11: Bryan Haczyk, F; Paul Zanette, F
2012–13: Carsen Chubak, G; Giancarlo Iuorio, F

Second Team All-Atlantic Hockey

2011–12: Chris Noonan, G
2012–13: Dan Weiss, D

Third Team All-Atlantic Hockey

2010–11: Ryan Annesley, D
2012–13: Kevin Ryan, D
2013–14: Kevin Ryan, D
2017–18: Derian Plouffe, F
2018–19: Noah Delmas, D; Ludwig Stenlund, F
2019–20: Jack Billings, F

Atlantic Hockey All-Rookie Team

2010–11: Ryan Rashid, F
2013–14: Vinny Muto, D
2014–15: Keegan Harper, D
2018–19: Ludwig Stenlund, F
2019–20: Chad Veltri, G
2020–21: Josef Mysak, D
2021–22: Shane Ott, F

Niagara Purple Eagles Hall of Fame
The following is a list of people associated with the men's ice hockey program who were elected into the Niagara Purple Eagles Hall of Fame (induction date in parenthesis).

Greg Gardner (2006)
Peter DeSantis (2007)
Mile Isherwood (2007)
Joe Tallari (2012)
Barret Ehgoetz (2013)
1999-2000 Men's Team (2016)

Purple Eagles in the NHL
As of July 1, 2022.

Source:

See also 
Niagara Purple Eagles women's ice hockey

References

External links 
Niagara Purple Eagles men's ice hockey

 
Ice hockey teams in New York (state)